Morant Cays Lighthouse is  south east of Jamaica on the easternmost point of North-East Cay in the Morant Cays. The Morant Cays are administratively part of St Thomas, Jamaica.

The light lists describe it as a framework tower, so the present tower might not be the original lighthouse.

It is maintained by the Port Authority of Jamaica, an agency of the Ministry of Transport and Works.

See also

 List of lighthouses in Jamaica.

References

External links
 Aerial view
 Picture of Morant Cays Lighthouse

Lighthouses in Jamaica
Buildings and structures in Saint Thomas Parish, Jamaica